Maria Solomou (born 1 October 1974 in Athens, Attica, Greece) is a Greek actress in television, theatre and cinema. She studied economy at the American College of Greece and acting at drama school "Iasmos – Vasilis Diamantopoulos".

Personal life
Solomou was in a relationship with Greek actor Marios Athanasiou. They have a son named Dimitris–Alexandros. Solomou and Athanasiou broke up in 2008. 
Since 2010, Solomou has been in a relationship with Greek singer Panos Mouzourakis. She has starred in the video clip of his song "Fila me akoma".

Filmography 
 Piso Porta (Back Door) (2000)
 The Bubble (2001)
 Aionios foititis (Forever student) (2001)
 I Lisa kai oloi oi alloi (Liza and all the others) (2003)
 S1ngles (2005–2008) TV Series
 Pente lepta akoma (Five more minutes) (2006)
 Pethainontas stin Athina (Dying in Athens) (2006)
 Oneiropagida (Dreamcatcher) (2010)
 Αν… (What if…) (2012)

Television

On stage
 To loutro by Chris Johnston (directed by Mina Adamaki) (2006)
 Prodosia by Harold Pinter (directed by Mina Adamaki) (2008)

References

External links
 
 Maria Solomou at Cine

Greek stage actresses
Greek television actresses
Living people
1972 births